Bite Down Hard is the third studio album by American glam metal band Britny Fox and the first to feature singer Tommy Paris. It also features guest appearances by Zakk Wylde and Poison drummer Rikki Rockett.

Critical reception

The Chicago Tribune deemed the songs "fast, seamless bits of Sunset Strip rock." The Washington Post wrote that, "the usual sexism aside, this is serviceable pop-metal."

Track listing
All songs by Tommy Paris and Billy Childs except where noted. 
 "Six Guns Loaded" (Paris, Michael Kelly Smith) - 3:46
 "Louder" - 3:53
 "Liar" - 4:42
 "Closer to Your Love" - 3:48
 "Over and Out" - 4:45
 "Shot from My Gun" (Paris, Smith) - 4:07
 "Black and White" (Paris, Smith, Childs, Johnny Dee) - 3:35
 "Look My Way" - 4:32
 "Lonely Too Long" (Paris, Smith) - 3:34
 "Midnight Moses" (Alex Harvey) - 4:28 (The Sensational Alex Harvey Band cover)

Credits
Band members
 Tommy Paris - lead vocals, rhythm guitar, guitar solos on tracks 7 and 9
 Michael Kelly Smith - lead guitar, backing vocals
 Billy Childs - bass, acoustic guitar on track 3 and 5, backing vocals
 Johnny Dee - drums

Additional musicians
Zakk Wylde - guitar solo at end of track 1
Rikki Rockett - percussion break in track 10

Production
John Purdell, Duane Baron - producers, engineers, mixing
Sean Odwyer, Ulrich Wild - assistant engineers
Howie Weinberg - mastering at Masterdisk, New York
Bob Defrin - art direction
John Scarpati - photography
Brittney Powell - cover model

References

Britny Fox albums
1991 albums
East West Records albums